Lake Chew Bahir (Amharic: ጨው ባሕር č̣ew bāhir, "salty lake") or Lake Istifanos, also called Stefanie, Basso Naebor and Chuwaha, is a lake in southern Ethiopia, located on the southwestern end of the Southern Nations, Nationalities and Peoples' Region, near the border with Oromia Region.

Geography
When the Lake Chew Bahir is filled, it stretches into northern Kenya.

This lake is the southernmost and lowest (1,880 ft, 573 m) of a series of lakes which lie in the north-easterly continuation of the Great Rift Valley; its watershed is separated from the watershed of Lake Turkana by the Humu Range and the hills south of it. The Kumbi Range rises on its eastern side. Chew Bahir is fed from the north by the Weito River, and its tributary the Galana Sagan. The Galana Sagan receives the overflow of Lake Chamo in some years, but no permanent connection exists.

History
Count Sámuel Teleki was the first European to visit the lake in 1888, and named it for Princess Stéphanie of Belgium, the wife of Crown Prince Rudolf of Austria. Following Teleki's visit, Lake Chew Bahir and the neighboring lakes were explored by Arthur Donaldson Smith, Vittorio Bottego, M. S. Welby, Oscar Neumann and others. J. J. Harrison in 1899 found the lake quite dried up, and two years later Count Wickenburg found water only in the northern part. In 1960 the lake covered about 2,000 km2, but shrank to a swamp over the rest of the 20th century.

References

Lakes of Ethiopia
Lakes of Kenya
Saline lakes of the Great Rift Valley
Ethiopia–Kenya border
International lakes of Africa
Chew
Important Bird Areas of Ethiopia